Windyville is an unincorporated community in Dallas County, Missouri, United States. It is located approximately 10 miles northeast of Buffalo along Missouri routes K and MM. The Niangua River flows past to the south and east of the community. It is part of the Springfield, Missouri Metropolitan Statistical Area

A post office called Windyville was established in 1921, and remained in operation until 1998. The community was so named for the frequently windy conditions at the town site.

Population 
There are currently 51 people that are housed in Windyville, Missouri. The population has dropped 66.7% in the last 20 years. It is 100% Caucasian. The married populace is also 100%. The community is mostly female, 56.9%, but the male population, 43.1%, isn't far behind. Windyville is a little but well-established community.

Haunted Windyville 
Windyville, Missouri has been said to be haunted. There are many rundown businesses and multiple cemeteries that all have creepy things said about them. In the 1800s there were multiple child deaths and now it has been reported that there is children's laughter that comes from one of the cemeteries. In the lone rock cemetery, there is known to be a horseback rider that watches over the cemetery. There is also a bridge that crosses a creek. It has been told that there is a woman who walks the bridge looking for her child. Many say that there are eerie things that go on in Windyville and you might think twice about making a visit there.

Windyville Cozy Cottage 
In 1916, the Windyville general store was built. Healey Bennett was the go-to man when people needed supplies and would always pick up extra when he went into town. The general store was only in Bennett's possession for a short amount of time before he sold it. The general store has had multiple owners and was shut down in the late 1900s. Recently, Katie Heflin has reopened the old Windyville general store and has turned it into a bed and breakfast. The Windyville Cozy Cottage opened in 2018 and now people can stay in Windyville anytime they want.

References

Unincorporated communities in Dallas County, Missouri
Springfield metropolitan area, Missouri
Unincorporated communities in Missouri